Lubomír Vlk (born 21 July 1964) is a former Czech football defender and manager. He played as a left back more prominently for TJ Vítkovice and FC Porto. He played for Czechoslovakia national football team. Currently he works for MFK Karviná as a club official. He was also a fantastic player in the Italia 90 football game with his diagonal runs

Club career

In the 1985/1986 season he won the Czechoslovak First League with Vítkovice.
He spent three seasons in FC Porto winning two league titles but he was plagued by injuries.
In 1993, he returned to Vítkovice but at the end of the season he picked up another knee injury that forced him to quit his career.

He became a club official and worked for FC Vítkovice until the club's bankruptcy in 2011.

References

External links
  ČMFS profile

1964 births
Living people
Czech footballers
Czechoslovak footballers
Czechoslovakia international footballers
MFK Vítkovice players
FC Porto players
Czech football managers
Expatriate footballers in Portugal
Czechoslovak expatriate footballers
Czechoslovak expatriate sportspeople in Portugal
Association football midfielders
People from Uherské Hradiště
MFK Vítkovice managers
MFK Karviná managers
Sportspeople from the Zlín Region